The Local Group is the galaxy group that includes the Milky Way.
It consists of two collections of galaxies in a "dumbbell" shape; the Milky Way and its satellites form one lobe, and the Andromeda Galaxy and its satellites constitute the other. The group itself is a part of the larger Virgo Supercluster, which may be a part of the Laniakea Supercluster.
The exact number of galaxies in the Local Group is unknown as some are occluded by the Milky Way; however, at least 80 members are known, most of which are dwarf galaxies.

The two largest members, the Andromeda and the Milky Way galaxies, are both spiral galaxies with masses of about  solar masses each. Each has its own system of satellite galaxies:
 The Andromeda Galaxy's satellite system consists of Messier 32 (M32), Messier 110 (M110), NGC 147, NGC 185, Andromeda I (And I), And II, And III, And V, And VI (also known as the Pegasus Dwarf Spheroidal Galaxy, or Pegasus dSph), And VII (a.k.a. the Cassiopeia Dwarf Galaxy), And VIII, And IX, And X, And XI, And XIX, And XXI and And XXII, plus several additional ultra-faint dwarf spheroidal galaxies.
 The Milky Way's satellite galaxies system comprises the Sagittarius Dwarf Galaxy, Large Magellanic Cloud, Small Magellanic Cloud, Canis Major Dwarf Galaxy (disputed, considered by some not a galaxy), Ursa Minor Dwarf Galaxy, Draco Dwarf Galaxy, Carina Dwarf Galaxy, Sextans Dwarf Galaxy, Sculptor Dwarf Galaxy, Fornax Dwarf Galaxy, Leo I (a dwarf galaxy), Leo II (a dwarf galaxy), Ursa Major I Dwarf Galaxy and Ursa Major II Dwarf Galaxy, plus several additional ultra-faint dwarf spheroidal galaxies.

It is unclear whether the Triangulum Galaxy is a companion of the Andromeda Galaxy; the two galaxies are 750,000 light years apart, and experienced a close passage 2–4 billion years ago which triggered star formation across Andromeda's disk. The Pisces Dwarf Galaxy is equidistant from the Andromeda Galaxy and the Triangulum Galaxy, so it may be a satellite of either.

The membership of NGC 3109, with its companions Sextans A and the Antlia Dwarf Galaxy, is uncertain due to extreme distances from the center of the Local Group.
The other members of the group are likely gravitationally secluded from these large subgroups: IC 10, IC 1613, Phoenix Dwarf Galaxy, Leo A, Tucana Dwarf Galaxy, Cetus Dwarf Galaxy, Pegasus Dwarf Irregular Galaxy, Wolf–Lundmark–Melotte, Aquarius Dwarf Galaxy, and Sagittarius Dwarf Irregular Galaxy.

History 

The term "The Local Group" was introduced by Edwin Hubble in Chapter VI of his 1936 book The Realm of the Nebulae. There, he described it as "a typical small group of nebulae which is isolated in the general field" and delineated, by decreasing luminosity, its members to be M31, Milky Way, M33, Large Magellanic Cloud, Small Magellanic Cloud, M32, NGC 205, NGC 6822, NGC 185, IC 1613 and NGC 147. He also identified IC 10 as a possible part of the Local Group.

Component galaxies

Map

List

Other objects 

 Magellanic Stream, a stream of gas being stripped off the Magellanic Clouds due to their interaction with the Milky Way
 Monoceros Ring, a ring of stars around the Milky Way that is proposed to consist of a stellar stream torn from the Canis Major Dwarf Galaxy

See also 
 Galaxy cluster
 IC 342/Maffei Group, the group of galaxies nearest to the Local Group
 List of galaxy groups and clusters
 List of nearest galaxies
 Virgocentric flow

References

External links 

 
 
 

 
Galaxy clusters
Virgo Supercluster